The 1976 FIA European Formula 3 Championship was the second edition of the FIA European Formula 3 Championship. The championship consisted of 10 rounds across the continent. The season was won by Italian driver Riccardo Patrese who competed for Trivellato Racing Team. He had the same number of points and wins with Conny Andersson after their one worst point results were dropped, but had more total score than Anderson. The third place in the drivers' standings was taken by Gianfranco Brancatelli, who was the only other driver to win the race.

Calendar

Results

Championship standings

References

External links

1976 in motorsport
FIA European Formula 3 Championship